Last Train to Lhasa is an album by Banco de Gaia which was released in 1995. It was released as double CD or triple LP. A "Special Limited" 3 CD/4 LP edition contained three additional remixes.

It is widely assumed that the album's techno and ambient compositions contain sampled chantings of the people of Tibet but in fact there is only one sampled Tibetan sound on the whole album.

The album reached No.31 in the UK's Album Charts. It would have entered the Top 30 but an error with the barcode on some copies led to not all sales being registered correctly. It did however still reach No.1 in the UK Independent Album Charts.

In 2002 the album was reissued on CD by Toby Marks's own Disco Gecko Recordings record label, and an expanded digital download version with extra tracks was made available in 2011. A new 4 CD Limited Edition version was released on June 21, 2015 to mark the album's 20th anniversary.

Influence
After a big success of the debut album Maya and a European tour with Transglobal Underground Toby Marks continued searching for new inspirations and began working on tracks for a new album. He joined The Tibet Support Group, a part of International Tibet Independence Movement and the decision of the Chinese government to build the Qingzang railway between the cities of Xining and the Tibetan capital of Lhasa inspired the title of one of the tracks. This later became the title of the whole album and Marks used the album's cover to highlight the plight of the Tibetan people under Chinese occupation.

"Amber" contains the sampled line "My god, it's full of stars…" from the Peter Hyams movie 2010: The Year We Make Contact.

The song "Last Train to Lhasa" was included in the first disc (named "0° North") of the album Northern Exposure released in 1996 by DJs Sasha & John Digweed.

Track listing

Disc one

Disc two

Disc three (limited edition)

Special Edition (2011 Digital Release)

20th Anniversary Edition

Disc one

Disc two

Disc three

Disc four

Singles

Last Train to Lhasa

Kincajou

Last Train to Lhasa 20th Anniversary EP

References

External links

1995 albums
Banco de Gaia albums